Luricocha District is one of eight districts of the province Huanta in Peru.

Ethnic groups 
The people in the district are mainly indigenous citizens of Quechua descent. The majority of the population (65.24%) learnt to speak Quechua in child. 34.44% of the residents' native language is Spanish (2007 Peru Census).

See also 
 Kachimayu
 Kuntur Sinqa

References